Daud Ibrahim (20 April 1947 – 11 November 2010) was a Malaysian cyclist. He competed in four events at the 1972 Summer Olympics.

References

External links
 

1947 births
2010 deaths
Malaysian male cyclists
Olympic cyclists of Malaysia
Cyclists at the 1972 Summer Olympics
Asian Games medalists in cycling
Cyclists at the 1970 Asian Games
Medalists at the 1970 Asian Games
Asian Games gold medalists for Malaysia
Asian Games bronze medalists for Malaysia
20th-century Malaysian people
21st-century Malaysian people